The Riviera Championships  also known as the Championship of the Riviera  and informally known as the French Riviera Championships was an open men's and women's international tennis tournament played at the Menton Lawn Tennis Club, Menton, Provence-Alpes-Côte d'Azur, France on clay courts from 1902 until 1976.

History
The Riviera Championships also known as the Championship of the Riviera was an open men's and women's international tennis tournament played at the Menton Lawn Tennis Club, Menton, Provence-Alpes-Côte d'Azur, France on clay courts. The first edition was inaugurated on 22 March 1902, the tournament ran until 1975. In 1904 a mixed doubles event was scheduled.

The tournament was part of the French Riviera circuit tennis tour, which was series of international amateur tennis events held on the French Riviera, usually starting at the end of the preceding year around late December, through until the end of April.

Finals

Men's Singles
Incomplete Roll

Men's Doubles
Incomplete Roll

Women's Singles

Mix Doubles
Incomplete Roll

References

Sources
 American Lawn Tennis. (1939). New York: American Lawn Tennis Publishing Company. 
 Auckland Star. National Library of New Zealand. 4 May 1906.
 Paret, Jahial Parmly; Allen, J. P.; Alexander, Frederick B.; Hardy, Samuel (1906). Spalding's tennis annual . New York: American sports publishing company.
 The Press Newspaper. National Library of New Zealand. 25 April 1913.
 The Northern Times. Carnarvon, WA: National Library of Australia. 
 The Press Newspaper. National Library of New Zealand. 25 April 1913. 
 Town & Country. New York, United States: Hearst Corporation. 1932.
 Writers, Staff. "1877 to 2012 Finals Results". Steve G Tennis. stevegtennis.com.

Clay court tennis tournaments
Defunct tennis tournaments in France